Sir Charles Cecil Farquharson Dundas (1884–1956) was a British colonial administrator, Governor of Uganda from 1940. He was the fifth son of Charles Saunders Dundas, 6th Viscount Melville.

Life

Dundas was district commissioner of the Moshi area in Tanzania during the 1920s.  In 1930 he founded the Kilimanjaro Native Cooperative Union.  He popularised the area's coffee production, and was given the title Wasaoye-o-Wachagga (Elder of the Chagga).

He noticed that, in Chagga society, care of the furrows was a prime social duty.  If a furrow was damaged, even accidentally, one of the elders would sound a horn in the evening (which was known as the call to the furrows).  The next morning, townspeople would leave their normal work and set about the business of repairing the damaged furrow.

Dundas became very popular and respected during his stay at Moshi.  When he left Moshi for the last time by train to Tanga and ship to Dar es Salaam, the Chagga reputedly hired a band to accompany him on board the ship and serenade him on his journey. As the boat sailed into Dar es Salaam harbour, the band apparently struck up God Save the King.  

Later on, Dundas was Governor of the Bahamas for eight years, to be replaced by the Duke of Windsor. Dundas then became Governor of Uganda.

Dundas is buried in Kensal Green Cemetery.

Bibliography
Sir Charles Dundas, Kilimanjaro and Its Peoples, 1924

Notes

British governors of the Bahamas
Governors of Uganda
1884 births
1956 deaths
20th-century Bahamian people
20th-century British politicians
British people in British Taganyika
Younger sons of viscounts